The 21st Alberta Hussars were a light cavalry regiment of the Non-Permanent Active Militia of the Canadian Militia (now the Canadian Army). In 1920, the regiment was reorganized as The Alberta Mounted Rifles.

Lineage

21st Alberta Hussars 

 Originated on 1 April 1908, in Medicine Hat, Alberta, as the 21st Alberta Hussars.
 Redesignated on 15 March 1920, as The Alberta Mounted Rifles.

Organization 
21st Alberta Hussars (1 April 1908)

 Regimental Headquarters (Medicine Hat, Alberta)
 A Squadron (first raised on 1 June 1901, as D Squadron, Canadian Mounted Rifles)
 B Squadron

Notable Members 

 Colonel James Frederick Scott 
 Lieutenant Colonel Nelson Spencer 
 Captain Charles Pingle

See also 

 List of regiments of cavalry of the Canadian Militia (1900–1920)

References 

Hussar regiments of Canada
Military units and formations of Alberta
Military units and formations established in 1908
Military units and formations disestablished in 1920